Tritonaclia kefersteinii is a moth in the subfamily Arctiinae. It was described by Arthur Gardiner Butler in 1882. It is found in Madagascar.

References

Arctiidae genus list at Butterflies and Moths of the World of the Natural History Museum

Moths described in 1882
Arctiinae